Liv Aasen (21 September 1928 – 21 August 2005) was a Norwegian politician for the Labour Party.

Aasen was born in Bergen. She was elected to the Parliament of Norway from Sør-Trøndelag in 1969, and was re-elected on four occasions, serving twenty years. On the local level she was a member of Kongsberg city council from 1955 to 1959 and of Trondheim city council from 1959 to 1963. Outside politics she worked as a school teacher in Fana, Kongsberg, Trondheim and Geneva. Aasen was married to Per Aasen, Norway's former ambassador to Iceland.

References

1928 births
2005 deaths
Norwegian schoolteachers
Members of the Storting
Labour Party (Norway) politicians
People from Kongsberg
Politicians from Trondheim
Women members of the Storting
20th-century Norwegian women politicians
20th-century Norwegian politicians
Norwegian expatriates in Switzerland